Steve Baker (born 25 June 1963) is a former international speedway rider from Australia.

Speedway career 
Baker reached the final of the Speedway World Pairs Championship in the 1987 Speedway World Pairs Championship. Also in 1987, he finished runner up in the Australian Championship.

He rode in the top tier of British Speedway from 1981 to 1985, riding for various clubs. He was the 1983 European Junior Champion, a competition that non-European riders could enter.

World Final appearances

World Pairs Championship
 1987 -  Pardubice, Svítkov Stadion (with Steve Regeling) - 7th - 21pts

World Longtrack Championship
 1987  Mühldorf 8th 10pts
 1988  Scheeßel 17th 2pts'''

References 

1963 births
Australian speedway riders
Halifax Dukes riders
King's Lynn Stars riders
Sheffield Tigers riders
Living people